Frederick North, 5th Earl of Guilford,  (7 February 1766 – 14 October 1827), styled The Honourable Frederick North until 1817, was a British politician and colonial administrator.

Early life and education 
North was a younger son of Prime Minister Frederick North, 2nd Earl of Guilford (usually referred to as Lord North). He was educated at Eton College (1775–82) and Christ Church, Oxford. In 1791, he converted to the Eastern Orthodox Church and became an ardent adherent. He was elected a Fellow of the Royal Society in 1794.

Career

Parliament
He represented Banbury in Parliament from 1792 to 1794.

Secretary of State for Corsica
North served as Secretary of State to the Viceroy Sir Gilbert Elliot from 1794 to 1796 during the short-lived Anglo-Corsican Kingdom . North was tasked with the delicate negotiations with Pasquale Paoli and came to consider that Corsica was effectively 'ungovernable'.

Governor of Ceylon
He served as first British Governor of Ceylon from 1798 to 1805. North built his official residence, the Doric Bungalow, near the Mannar Sea according to his own plan; he himself used to supervise the pearl fishery, which at that time provided a substantial income for the British.
In 1817, he succeeded his elder brother as fifth Earl of Guilford.

Ionian Academy
In 1824, North established the Ionian Academy on the island of Corfu, which was under British control as part of the United States of the Ionian Islands. It was the first University to be established in modern Greece. In this context, he financed the studies in France (at Ecole polytechnique ) of Giovanni Carandino, the founder of the modern Greek mathematics. The academy has now closed but a statue of the Earl stands on the island. A library and a street are also named after him.

Death
Lord Guilford died unmarried in October 1827, aged 61, and was succeeded in his titles by his cousin, Francis North, 6th Earl of Guilford .

Notes

References 
Miller, W., The Ottoman Empire and its Successors: 1801–1927 (London, 1966), p. 123
Kidd, Charles, Williamson, David (editors). Debrett's Peerage and Baronetage (1990 edition). New York: St Martin's Press, 1990.

External links

1766 births
1827 deaths
18th-century English nobility
19th-century English nobility
Alumni of Christ Church, Oxford
North, Frederick
Earls of Guilford
Children of prime ministers of the United Kingdom
Knights Grand Cross of the Order of St Michael and St George
North, Frederick
Governors of British Ceylon
Members of the Parliament of Great Britain for English constituencies
British MPs 1790–1796
Frederick
British philhellenes
Barons Guilford